Peter Blackmore may refer to:

Peter Blackmore (politician) (born 1945), Australian politician and mayor
Peter Blackmore (footballer) (1879–?), English footballer
Peter Blackmore (screenwriter) (1909–1984), British screenwriter of Miranda, Mrs. Gibbons' Boys, Mad About Men, and Time Gentlemen, Please! amongst others